Li Juan (栗 娟, born 5 October 1968) is a Chinese long-distance runner. She competed in the women's marathon at the 1988 Summer Olympics.  She won the 1987 Hong Kong Marathon in a time of 2:37:35.

References

External links
 

1968 births
Living people
Athletes (track and field) at the 1988 Summer Olympics
Chinese female long-distance runners
Chinese female marathon runners
Olympic athletes of China
Place of birth missing (living people)